George David "Zambo" Zamka (born 1962) is a former NASA astronaut and United States Marine Corps pilot with over 3500 flight hours in more than 30 different aircraft. Zamka piloted the Space Shuttle Discovery in its October 2007 mission to the International Space Station and served as the commander of mission STS-130 in February 2010.

Personal
George David Zamka was born in 1962 at Margaret Hague Hospital in Jersey City, New Jersey. He was raised in New York City; Irvington, New York; Medellin, Colombia,; and Rochester Hills, Michigan. He graduated from Rochester Adams High School in Michigan in 1980.

Zamka is married and has two children. His extended family resides in Colorado, Mississippi, Georgia, Indiana, Florida and Tennessee. Zamka is of Colombian and Polish ancestry.

Military career
Zamka graduated with a Bachelor of Science degree in mathematics from the United States Naval Academy in 1984. He was then commissioned as a second lieutenant in the United States Marine Corps.  He received A-6E Intruder training at Naval Air Station Whidbey Island, Washington in 1985–1987. He was assigned to VMA(AW)-242 at Marine Corps Air Station El Toro, California.  In addition to flight safety and administration, he was a squadron weapons and tactics instructor. In 1990, he trained as an F/A-18D Hornet pilot and was then assigned to VMFA(AW)-121.  Zamka flew 66 combat missions during Operation Desert Storm. In 1993, he was assigned to the 1st Battalion, 5th Marines at Marine Corps Base Camp Pendleton, California as a forward air controller. In December 1994, he graduated from the U.S. Air Force Test Pilot School, following which, he served as an F/A-18 Hornet test pilot and operations officer.

In 1997, he earned a Masters of Science degree in engineering management from the Florida Institute of Technology. In 1998, he returned to VMFA(AW)-121 and deployed to MCAS Iwakuni, Japan.

In August 2010, Zamka retired from the Marine Corps after almost 30 years of distinguished service.  he is chairman of the board of the National Association of Spaceports.

NASA career
In June 1998, Zamka was selected for the NASA astronaut program, and reported for training in August. He served as lead for the Shuttle training and procedures division and as supervisor for the astronaut candidate class of 2004. Zamka made his first spaceflight as the pilot of mission STS-120, and second as the commander for STS-130.

Honors and awards
Zamka has received the following honors and awards: the Legion of Merit, Distinguished Flying Cross, Defense Meritorious Service Medal, Meritorious Service Medal, Navy Strike Air Medal (6), Navy Commendation Medal with Combat "V", and various other military service and campaign awards. Distinguished Graduate, U.S. Naval Academy. Commodore's list and Academic Achievement Award, Training Air Wing Five. Recipient of the NASA Outstanding Leadership Medal, two NASA Space Flight Medals, four NASA Superior Accomplishment Awards and the GEM Award. He received also Officer's Cross of the Order of Merit of the Republic of Poland (2010).

Promotional activities

In March 2008, Zamka visited Colombia's Planetarium of Bogotá with the crew of mission STS-120 to share their experience as NASA astronauts with 200 students, 50 teachers, and 20 science major experts.

See also

Hispanics in the United States Marine Corps
Hispanics in the United States Naval Academy
List of Hispanic astronauts

References
This article incorporates text in the public domain from the National Aeronautics and Space Administration, a United States government agency.

NASA Appoints Crew for Space Station Mission, UPI, 2006-06-20. Retrieved on 2006-06-25.
Spacefacts biography of George D. Zamka

External links

Living people
United States Marine Corps astronauts
American people of Polish descent
American people of Colombian descent
People from Jersey City, New Jersey
People from Rochester Hills, Michigan
United States Naval Academy alumni
U.S. Air Force Test Pilot School alumni
Florida Institute of Technology alumni
United States Marine Corps colonels
United States Naval Aviators
United States Marine Corps personnel of the Gulf War
American test pilots
Recipients of the Legion of Merit
Recipients of the Distinguished Flying Cross (United States)
Recipients of the Air Medal
Recipients of the Order of Merit of the Republic of Poland
People from Irvington, New York
1962 births
Space Shuttle program astronauts
Hispanic and Latino American scientists
Military personnel from New Jersey
Military personnel from Michigan
Hispanic and Latino American aviators